An Introduction to UFO is a 2006 CD compilation of songs by the British hard rock band UFO, extracted mainly from the band's first two albums.

Track listing
"Boogie" - 4:17
"Prince Kajuku" - 3:56
"Timothy" - 3:29
"C'mon Everybody" - 3:12
"Follow You Home" - 2:14
"Shake It About" - 3:47
"Galactic Love" - 2:56
"(Come Away) Melinda" - 5:06
"Unidentified Flying Object" - 2:19
"Loving Cup" - 3:52
"Give Her the Gun" - 4:00
"Sweet Little Thing" - 3:51
"Evil" - 3:27
"Who Do You Love?" - 7:50
"C'mon Everybody" (live) - 4:20
"Rock Bottom" (live) - 8:52

References

2006 compilation albums
UFO (band) compilation albums